"Reno" is a song written by Ruby Allmond, and recorded by American country music artist Dottie West.  It was released August 1968 as the first single from the album The Best of Dottie West.  The song peaked at number 19 on the Billboard Hot Country Singles chart. In addition, "Reno" peaked at number 6 on the Canadian RPM Country chart.

Chart performance

References

1968 singles
Dottie West songs
Song recordings produced by Chet Atkins
RCA Victor singles
1968 songs